Orlovsky is a rural locality (a khutor) in Novonikolayevskoye Rural Settlement, Novonikolayevsky District, Volgograd Oblast, Russia. The population was 234 as of 2010. There are 16 streets.

Geography 
Orlovsky is located in steppe, on the Khopyorsko-Buzulukskaya Plain, 7 km north of Novonikolayevsky (the district's administrative centre) by road. Novonikolayevsky is the nearest rural locality.

References 

Rural localities in Novonikolayevsky District